Gianfranco Spadaccia (28 February 1935 – 24 September 2022) was an Italian journalist and politician. A member of the Radical Party and the Transnational Radical Party, he served in the Chamber of Deputies from 1983 to 1986 and again from 2 to 4 July 1990. He also served in the Senate of the Republic from 1987 to 1990.

Spadaccia died in Rome on 24 September 2022, at the age of 87.

References

1935 births
2022 deaths
Italian journalists
Senators of Legislature VIII of Italy
Senators of Legislature X of Italy
Deputies of Legislature IX of Italy
Deputies of Legislature X of Italy
Italian Democratic Socialist Party politicians
Radical Party (Italy) politicians
Italian Radicals politicians
Sapienza University of Rome alumni
Politicians from Rome